Kinectin is a protein that in humans is encoded by the KTN1 gene.

Function 

Various cellular organelles and vesicles are transported along the microtubules in the cytoplasm. Likewise, membrane recycling of the endoplasmic reticulum (ER), Golgi assembly at the microtubule organizing center, and alignment of lysosomes along microtubules are all related processes. The transport of organelles requires a special class of microtubule-associated proteins (MAPs). One of these is the molecular motor kinesin (see MIM 148760 and MIM 600025), an ATPase that moves vesicles unidirectionally toward the plus end of the microtubule. Another such MAP is kinectin, a large integral ER membrane protein. Antibodies directed against kinectin have been shown to inhibit its binding to kinesin.[supplied by OMIM]

Interactions 

KTN1 has been shown to interact with EEF1D, RhoG and RHOA.

References

Further reading